Robert Sweeting (born June 5, 1987) is an American former cyclist.

Major results

2011
 2nd Overall Tour of Elk Grove
1st Stage 2
2013
 6th Overall Tour of Alberta
 9th Overall Tour of Taihu Lake
2015
 1st Stage 8 Vuelta a la Independencia Nacional

References

External links

1987 births
Living people
American male cyclists